The Integrated Food Security Phase Classification (IPC), also known as IPC scale, is a tool for improving food security analysis and decision-making. It is a standardised scale that integrates food security, nutrition and livelihood information into a statement about the nature and severity of a crisis and implications for strategic response.

The IPC was originally developed in 2004 for use in Somalia by the United Nations Food and Agriculture Organization's Food Security Analysis Unit (FSAU). Several national governments and international agencies, including CARE International, European Commission Joint Research Centre (EC JRC), Food and Agricultural Organization of the United Nations (FAO), USAID/FEWS NET, Oxfam GB, Save the Children UK/US, and United Nations World Food Programme (WFP), have been working together to adapt it to other food security contexts.

IPC scale 
The following table includes a summary of the IPC scale:

See also 
 Famine scales
 Global Acute Malnutrition

References

External links 
 Website of the Integrated Food Security Phase Classification
 Integrated Food Security and Humanitarian Phase Classification: Technical Manual (Version 1.1)

Food security